Collen Mulaudzi (born 8 April 1991) is a South African long-distance runner. He competed in the men's race at the 2020 World Athletics Half Marathon Championships held in Gdynia, Poland.

In 2017, he represented South Africa at the Summer Universiade, held in Taipei, Taiwan, in the men's half marathon event. He finished in 19th place.

Achievements

References

External links 
 

Living people
1991 births
Place of birth missing (living people)
South African male long-distance runners
Competitors at the 2017 Summer Universiade